The Sixth Schedule of the Constitution of India allows for the formation of autonomous administrative divisions which have been given autonomy within their respective states. Most of these autonomous district councils are located in North East India with the exception of two in Ladakh and one in West Bengal. Presently, 10 Autonomous Councils in Assam, Meghalaya, Mizoram and Tripura are formed by virtue of the Sixth Schedule with the rest being formed as a result of other legislation.

Powers and competencies

Executive and legislative powers
Under the provisions  of the Sixth Schedule of the Constitution of India, autonomous district councils can make laws, rules and regulations in the following areas:

Land management
Forest management
Water resources
Agriculture and cultivation
Formation of village councils
Public health
Sanitation
Village and town level policing
Appointment of traditional chiefs and headmen
Inheritance of property
Marriage and divorce
Social customs
Money lending and trading
Mining and minerals

Judicial powers
Autonomous district councils have powers to form courts to hear cases where both parties are members of Scheduled Tribes and the maximum sentence is less than 5 years in prison.

Taxation and revenue
Autonomous district councils have powers to levy taxes, fees and tolls on: building and land, animals, vehicles, boats, entry of goods into the area, roads, ferries, bridges, employment and income and general taxes for the maintenance of schools and roads.

List of autonomous administrative divisions
Autonomous district councils operating under the Sixth Schedule of the Constitution of India are shown in bold.

{| class="wikitable mw-collapsible mw-collapsed"
! colspan="3" |Legends
|-
! colspan="2" |Party
!ECI Recognition
|-
|AKRSU(K)
|All Koch-Rajbanshi Students’ Union
|N/A
|-
|AITC
|All India Trinamool Congress
|National Party
|-
|AGP
|Asom Gana Parishad
|State Party
|-
|BJP
|Bhartiya Janta Party
|National Party
|-
|BPF
|Bododland People's Front
|State Party
|-
|GNC
|Garo National Council
|Registered Unrecognized Party
|-
|GSP
|Gana Suraksha Party
|Registered Unrecognized Party
|-
|HSPDP
|Hill State People's Democratic Party
|State Party
|-
|INC
|Indian National Congress
|National Party
|-
|JKNC
|Jammu & Kashmir National Conference
|State Party
|-
|KADF
|Karbi Anglong Democratic Forum
|N/A
|-
|MNF
|Mizo National Front
|State Party
|-
|NPP
|National People's Party
|National Party
|-
|PDF
|People's Democratic Front (Meghalaya)
|State Party
|-
|RHJMC
|Rabha Hasong Joint Movement Committee
|N/A
|-
|SGS
|Sanmilita Gana Shakti
|Registered Unrecognized Party
|-
|TIPRI
|The Indigenous Progressive Regional Alliance
|State Party
|-
|UDP
|United Democratic Party (Meghalaya)
|State Party
|-
|UPPL
|United People's Party Liberal
|State Party
|}

De facto self-governing areas

North Sentinel Island 
North Sentinel Island is situated in the island chain of the Andaman and Nicobar Islands which is a union territory of India. It is home to the Sentinelese people, who are among some of the world's last uncontacted peoples. They reject any contact with other people and are among the last people to remain virtually untouched by modern civilization. There has never been any treaty with the people of the island nor any record of a physical occupation.

The Andaman and Nicobar Administration has stated that they have no intention of interfering with the Sentinelese's lifestyle or habitat. Although the island is likely to have suffered seriously from the effects of the December 2004 tsunami, the survival of the Sentinelese was confirmed when, some days after the event, an Indian government helicopter observed several of them, who shot arrows at the hovering aircraft to repel it.

Although this has not been done with any formal treaty, the official policy of minimal interference has ensured that they have de facto autonomy and sovereignty over their island under the framework of the central and local governments.

See also
States and territories of India
List of autonomous areas by country

References

External links
Sixth Schedule of the Constitution of India

Administrative divisions of India
Autonomous regions of India